Sa'adeh College School is a primary school, secondary school, and college in Arjan, Amman, Jordan.

Schools in Amman